Freedom Falcon may refer to:
Champion Freedom Falcon, motorglider
Operation Freedom Falcon, part of the 2011 military intervention in Libya